"Soft-Boiled Sergeant" is a short story by J. D. Salinger published in the 1944 edition of The Saturday Evening Post.

Plot
"Soft-Boiled Sergeant" chronicles a young soldier's entry into the military.
The title refers to the good-natured Staff Sergeant, Burke, whom the young soldier meets. Burke helps him to go through difficulties with other people and helps him overcome some of his nervousness among the other soldiers and the environment.

History
The piece was originally titled "Death of a Dogface" and the magazine's decision to change the title, as well as use a "cute" illustration to accompany the piece, made Salinger deeply resentful.

References

1944 short stories
Short stories by J. D. Salinger
Works originally published in The Saturday Evening Post